Otway may refer to:

Places

Australia
Cape Otway, a geographical feature on the coast of Victoria, Australia
Shire of Colac Otway, Victoria, Australia
Great Otway National Park, a national park in Victoria, Australia
Otway Basin, a geological feature with natural gas reserves spanning the coast of South Australia and Victoria
Otway Ranges in Victoria, Australia
Parish of Otway, a cadastral land division in the County of Polwarth in Western Victoria

Elsewhere
Otway, Ohio, a village in the United States
Otway Massif, massif in Antarctica
Seno Otway, inland sound in southern Chilie

People
Otway Burns (1775–1850), American privateer
Otway (surname)

Other uses
HMAS Otway, two submarines of the Royal Australian Navy
Otway (1800 ship), British sailing ship in the slave trade
Otway-Rees protocol, computer network authentication protocol
SS Otway A passenger liner sunk in 1917